Dixonville is a former unincorporated community in Guthrie Township, Lawrence County, Indiana.

History
Dixonville was platted on April 8, 1853, by Thomas and William Dixon. It was platted in the center of section 10, township 4, range 2 east.

References

Unincorporated communities in Lawrence County, Indiana
Unincorporated communities in Indiana